Wilfred James Pallot (5 November 1884 – 17 November 1957) was a Welsh field hockey player from Cardiff, who competed in the 1908 Summer Olympics. In 1908 he won the bronze medal as member of the team Wales.

References

External links
 
profile

1884 births
1957 deaths
Welsh male field hockey players
Olympic field hockey players of Great Britain
British male field hockey players
Field hockey players at the 1908 Summer Olympics
Olympic bronze medallists for Great Britain
Sportspeople from Cardiff
Olympic medalists in field hockey
Welsh Olympic medallists
Medalists at the 1908 Summer Olympics